Lopar is a Croatian municipality of Primorje–Gorski Kotar County. It gained the municipality status in 2006 and its population is 1,263 as of 2011.

Geography

The municipality is situated in the northeastern part of the Rab island. Close to its coast there are located the two little islands of Goli otok and Sveti Grgur.

Notable people
Lopar is considered the birthplace of Saint Marinus (born in the island of Rab), the founder of the eponymous republic.

Tourism
Lopar is popular for its sandy beaches like San Marino beach, or Sahara Beach.

See also
 San Marino, Croatia

References

External links
Official website of Lopar
Touristic site of Lopar
rab360 virtual tours Lopar

Municipalities of Croatia
Populated places in Primorje-Gorski Kotar County
Rab
Seaside resorts in Croatia